Crossing the Bridge is a 1992 American drama film starring Josh Charles, Stephen Baldwin and Jason Gedrick.

Characters Mort Golden (Josh Charles), Tim Reese (Jason Gedrick) and Danny Morgan (Stephen Baldwin) are friends who embark on a dangerous drug-smuggling venture.

The film was written and directed by Mike Binder and loosely based on Binders' friends during the late 1970s in the Detroit/Birmingham, MI area.

Much of the plot concerns the three friends driving into Canada as couriers in a drug deal. When returning to the United States at the Ambassador Bridge crossing between Windsor, Ontario and Detroit, the protagonists face possible capture by authorities.

Cast
Jason Gedrick as Tim Reese
Josh Charles as Mort Golden
Stephen Baldwin as Danny Morgan
Jeffrey Tambor as Uncle Alby
David Schwimmer as John Anderson
Cheryl Pollak as Carol Brockton
Richard Edson as Mitchell
Abraham Benrubi as Rinny
Ken Jenkins as Lou Golden
Rita Taggart as Kate Golden

Soundtrack 
 "Smoke on the Water" by Peter Himmelman
 "I'd Love to Change the World" by Ten Years After
 "Fortunate Son" by Creedence Clearwater Revival
 "These Days" by Jackson Browne
 "Love Song" by Elton John
 "Bad Company" by Bad Company
 "Locomotive Breath" by Ian Anderson
 "The Shadow of Your Smile" by Tony Bennett
 "Wild Thing" by Jimi Hendrix
 "From the Beginning" by Emerson, Lake & Palmer
 "Til It Shines" by Bob Seger
 "Impermanent Things" by Peter Himmelman

References

External links 
 
 
 

1992 films
1992 comedy-drama films
Films about the illegal drug trade
Films directed by Mike Binder
Films set in 1975
Films set in Detroit
Films shot in Michigan
Films shot in Minnesota
Touchstone Pictures films
1992 directorial debut films
American comedy-drama films
1990s English-language films
1990s American films